was a Japanese politician who served in the House of Representatives and as Chief Cabinet Secretary from 1972 to 1974. He was a member of the Liberal Democratic Party and headed one of its most powerful factions in the 1980s.

Early life 
Nikaidō was born in Kagoshima Prefecture. He moved to the United States in 1932, and graduated from the University of Southern California with a degree in political science. He remained in the United States until August 1941, when he returned to Japan on the Tatsuta Maru. During World War II, he worked in the Ministry of Foreign Affairs and as a non-combatant in the Imperial Japanese Navy.

Political career 
Nikaidō unsuccessfully ran as an opposition candidate for the House of Representatives in the 1942 general election. Following the war, he was involved in the formation of the Japan Cooperative Party (1945) and National Cooperative Party (1947). He won his first elected seat in the House of Representatives in the country's first postwar general election in 1946, lost his bid for re-election in the 1947 general election, and returned to the House in the 1949 general election. During this time, he became acquainted with future political allies Kakuei Tanaka and Takeo Miki. Nikaidō lost his seat again in the 1952 general election, but returned to the House again in the 1955 general election and thereafter held his seat until retiring in 1996, winning 16 consecutive elections.

Nikaidō was a supporter of Eisaku Satō's Diet faction starting in 1957, and served in the Sato cabinet as Director of the Science and Technology Agency and Director of the Hokkaido Development Agency from 1966 to 1967. He later became a key supporter of Kakuei Tanaka, and served as Tanaka's Chief Cabinet Secretary from 1972 to 1974.

Nikaidō served as LDP Secretary-General from 1981 to 1983, during which time Tanaka was convicted of bribery for his role in the Lockheed bribery scandals (in which Nikaidō himself was not implicated). In 1984, former Prime Minister Zenkō Suzuki backed Nikaidō, who was then 75, in an ill-fated party leadership struggle against Prime Minister Yasuhiro Nakasone. Nikaidō thereafter served as LDP Vice-President from 1984 to 1986. During this time, Tanaka was hospitalized following a stroke, and Nikaidō served as titular chairman of the Tanaka faction, but was challenged by Noboru Takeshita.

Nikaidō died of heart failure in February 2000 at the age of 90.

Amami reversion movement 
As a lawmaker representing Kagoshima Prefecture, Nikaidō played some role in the reversion movement of the Amami Islands, which were part of Kagoshima Prefecture but were administratively separated from Japan by the U.S. military from 1946 to 1953. In July 1950, on his way back from a visitation to Okinawa, Nikaidō visited Amami Ōshima and gave a speech at a mass rally calling for Amami's return to Japan. On August 18, he asked an "emergency question" on Amami's reversion to Japan at a Lower House plenary session. The question was a political compromise between the Diet and the Amami Islanders since the Diet was unable to pass a resolution on Amami's reversion that would conflict with a peace treaty the Diet was soon to ratify. Nevertheless, it was the first manifestation of long-standing efforts to single out Amami from the other areas under U.S. military occupation (i.e., Okinawa and Ogasawara) at the Diet to facilitate an earlier return of Amami.

References 

1909 births
2000 deaths
Liberal Democratic Party (Japan) politicians
University of Southern California alumni
Government ministers of Japan
People from Kagoshima Prefecture
Imperial Japanese Navy personnel of World War II